Breistroff-la-Grande is a commune in the Moselle department in Grand Est in northeastern France.

The localities of Boler (German: Boler) and Évange (German: Ewingen) are incorporated in the commune.

Population

See also
 Communes of the Moselle department

References

External links
 

Communes of Moselle (department)